"Do It" is the debut single by rapper Rasheeda, released as the lead single from her debut album Dirty South, which features Pastor Troy and Re Re. Additional vocals were made by Quebo Gold and it was produced by Karesha Jones.

"Do It" was released almost a year prior to the album in April 2000, it peaked on Billboard Hot Rap Songs chart at number 7 the next month. The music video was released in February 2001.

In 2014, Complex magazine assessed "Do It" as a "major crunk anthem".

Chart positions

References 

2001 debut singles
2001 songs
Motown singles